Tsarche fortress is a ruined Early Medieval fortification near the village of Tsarche in Abkhazia, Georgia.

History 
The Tsarche fortress sits on the top of a hill, near confluence of rivers Okhoja and  Chkhortoli.  Contours of the fortress walls repeat an elliptical shape of the hill. The fortress lies in ruins; only a 7–8 m high northern arc survives. In the middle of the fortress, a narrow stone staircase runs to a combat path. The wall is supplied with a walking trail whose width could accommodate two persons at a time. In the southeastern section, there is a reservoir with plastered walls.

The law of Georgia treats the monument as part of cultural heritage in the occupied territories and reported an urgent need of conservation.

References 

Castles and forts in Georgia (country)
Fortifications in Abkhazia
Cultural heritage of Georgia (country)